Capitancillo (historically Islote de Captitoncillo and variously Capitancillo islet) is a small coral island (about 600 hectares in size) near Bogo, Cebu, Philippines. The island is a protected marine sanctuary, featuring three dive sites and a lighthouse.

Etymology
Capitáncillo is Spanish for "subchief", from capitán ("captain") + -cillo (diminutive suffix).

Location and geography 
Capitancillo is a small uninhabited island northeast of Cebu Island in the Camotes Sea. Three areas around the island (the Ormoc Shoal, the Nuñez Shoal, and the southwest wall of Capitancillo) are recognized dive sites. Polambato Port, Nailon Wharf, Marangog Cove, and Odlot Hideaway all serve as jumping-off points to the island from Bogo, and the trip takes anywhere from fifteen to 45 minutes. There are no stores nor accommodation available on the island.

Lighthouse
The original lighthouse was listed in the Faros Españoles de Ultramar as one of 27 major lighthouses of the Philippines. The Capitancillo lighthouse was built in 1905, with the current white steel tower dating from the 1950s.

See also 

 Lighthouses in the Philippines
 List of islands in the Philippines
 List of islands
 Desert island

References

Sources

External links
 Capitancillo Island at OpenStreetMap

Islands of Cebu
Uninhabited islands of the Philippines
Bogo, Cebu